Ward Stream is a meltwater stream from the Ward Glacier in the Denton Hills on the Scott Coast of Antarctica. It flows eastward through Ward Valley and Ward Lake into Alph Lake. It was named by the New Zealand Geographic Board in 1994 in association with Ward Glacier and Ward Lake.

References

Rivers of Antarctica
Scott Coast